The men's 400 metres event at the 1997 Summer Universiade was held at the Stadio Cibali in Catania, Italy on 29 and 30 August.

Medalists

Results

Heats

Quarterfinals

Semifinals

Final

References

Athletics at the 1997 Summer Universiade
1997